Guy Solomon (born 23 September 1977) is an Israeli former goalkeeper who is the goalkeeping coach of the Israel national under-19 football team.

He started his pro career in 1998 at Maccabi Herzliya after he left his youth club Maccabi Tel Aviv. He also played for Maccabi Netanya and Beitar Jerusalem before returning to his home club. For most of his career he played as a back-up and rarely got a chance as first option.

Honours
Israeli Toto Cup:
2008-09

See also
List of Jewish footballers
List of Jews in sports
List of Jews in sports (non-players)
List of Israelis

References

External links
 

1977 births
Living people
Israeli footballers
Maccabi Herzliya F.C. players
Maccabi Netanya F.C. players
Beitar Jerusalem F.C. players
Maccabi Tel Aviv F.C. players
Hapoel Ramat Gan F.C. players
Hapoel Ra'anana A.F.C. players
Liga Leumit players
Israeli Premier League players
Footballers from Ramat HaSharon
People from Ramat HaSharon
Association football goalkeepers
Israeli Jews
Jewish footballers